Harald Heinke (born 15 May 1955 in Eilenburg) is a former East German judoka who competed in the 1980 Summer Olympics.

References

External links
 

1955 births
Living people
People from Eilenburg
People from Bezirk Leipzig
German male judoka
Sportspeople from Saxony
Olympic judoka of East Germany
Judoka at the 1980 Summer Olympics
Olympic bronze medalists for East Germany
Olympic medalists in judo
Medalists at the 1980 Summer Olympics
20th-century German people